The Botswana Scouts Association, the national Scouting organization of Botswana, was founded in 1936, and became a member of the World Organization of the Scout Movement in 1958. The boys only Botswana Scouts Association claims a membership of more than 10,000 Scouts; however, WOSM lists only 2,075 members as of 2011.

Activities
Scouts in Botswana grow up learning the outdoor skills from their parents and family. They use skills such as fire building and cooking, finding the direction of travel by use of the sun and stars, knots, pioneering, first aid and more, in everyday life. 

Scout groups meet in local schools or in the outdoors in villages. Scouts have been involved in the self-help projects and other rural activities. Some of these long-term projects are poultry farming, beekeeping, wood and metalworking, and fruit and vegetable production. 

Scouts often take long, adventurous trips into the bush. Their trips require much care, as there are numerous dangerous animals such as elephants and lions.

Adult male leadership is difficult in Botswana, as adult males do not associate themselves with children until they reach the age of 14. As a result of this, most leaders are women, teachers and clergymen.

Many Scout troops have their own vegetable gardens and are taught how to care for cattle, sheep and goats.

Program sections
Cub Scouts
Boy Scouts
Rovers

The Scout Motto is Nna o i Paakantse, Be Prepared in Tswana.

Emblem
The membership badge of the Botswana Scouts Association features a lion's head, a symbol in use since Botswana was a colonial branch of British Scouting.

See also
 Botswana Girl Guides Association

References

External links
Official website

World Organization of the Scout Movement member organizations
Scouting and Guiding in Botswana
Youth organizations established in 1936